The speaker of the Tennessee House of Representatives is the presiding officer of the lower chamber of the Tennessee General Assembly, the state legislature of the U.S. state of Tennessee.  The speaker is elected by other members of the House for a two-year term.  The current Speaker is Cameron Sexton Cameron Sexton (R-Crossville). Sexton was elected and took over from Acting-Speaker Bill Dunn, who assumed office upon the resignation of Glen Casada, effective August 2, 2019.

References

External links
Tennessee Blue Book

Lists of Tennessee politicians
Tennessee